Joe Cooksey (born June 11, 1966) is an American professional stock car racing driver. He has competed in the ARCA Menards Series from 1996 to 2022, and has 57 top-10 finishes and one pole position. He also has run three races in the NASCAR Busch Series and one race in the NASCAR Craftsman Truck Series.

Racing career
Cooksey first made his ARCA Bondo/Mar-Hyde Series debut in 1996 driving the No. 41 Chevrolet that he owned at Salem Speedway, where he would finish 22th due to a rear end issue. He would made eight more starts that year and would earn four to-10's, including a best result of sixth at Indianapolis Raceway Park. In the following year, he would run twelve races, mainly in the No. 51 Chevrolet, and would earn four more top-10's with a best result of seventh at the DuQuoin State Fairgrounds Racetrack, and finished 12th in the overall standings. In 1998, he would run 18 of the 22 races on the schedule, and finished in the top-10 nine times, including a best finish of third at Winchester Speedway.

In 1999, Cooksey would run the full schedule in his self owned No. 51 entry. In the first race of the year at Daytona International Speedway, during a caution period midway through the race, Cooksey collided with the back of the pace car. He, along with pace car driver Jack Wallace and ARCA official Buster Auton, escaped serious injury. Afterwards, he would earn eleven top-10's and four top-5's, including a best finish of second at Flat Rock Speedway, to finish fourth in the standings. In the following year, he would partner with Don Fauerbach for the full season in 2000, and would finish on the top-10 five times with a best finish of third at the Illinois State Fairgrounds Racetrack, and would get his first pole position at DuQuoin, to finish ninth in the standings. This would be the last time he would run the full ARCA schedule.

In 2001, he would downsize his schedule, only racing in nine races, and finishing in the top-10 five times. It was also during this year that he made his NASCAR Busch Series driving the No. 73 Chevrolet at Gateway International Raceway, finishing 29th due to a brake issue. He would make two more Busch races that year at Indianapolis and Memphis Motorsports Park. For next year, he would make his NASCAR Craftsman Truck Series debut in the No. 59 Chevrolet driving for Fauerbach at Gateway, and would finish 23rd. He would also attempt to make the race at Memphis, but failed to qualify for the event. On the ARCA side, he would make only three starts, finishing in the top-5 twice at both dirt events at Springfield and DuQuoin. In the following year, he would solely focus on ARCA, running nine races with a best finish of third at DuQuoin.

In 2004, Cooksey would run a majority of the races driving for Hixson Motorsports in the No. 23, and would earn five top-10's with a best finish of fifth at South Boston Speedway. In 2005, he would run thirteen races for Hixson, with one top-5, a third place finish at Springfield. In the following year, he would only run the two dirt events, and finished in the top-5 in both events. He would enter in both races the following year in 2007, driving for Darrell Basham in the No. 94 Chevrolet, finishing 29th due to a crash at Springfield, and failing to qualify at DuQuoin.

After not running in ARCA competition in 2008, he would return to the ARCA circuit in 2009, driving three races in his self owned No. 51 Chevrolet, and finished 7th at DuQuoin. After a one year absence, he would run only one race at DuQuoin, finishing 19th. In the following year, he would run at Springfield, finishing 33rd due to a engine problem.

After not running in the series in the next three years, Cooksey would run at DuQuoin driving for Hixson in their No. 2 entry, finishing eighth. He would run both dirt events the following year, finishing ninth at DuQuoin. In 2018, he would both dirt races as well as the race at Nashville Fairgrounds Speedway, finished ninth at DuQuoin again. After another three year absence from the series, he would return to DuQuoin in 2022, driving the No. 11 Toyota for Fast Track Racing, and finished eighth in the race.

Motorsports results

NASCAR
(key) (Bold – Pole position awarded by qualifying time. Italics – Pole position earned by points standings or practice time. * – Most laps led.)

Busch Series

Craftsman Truck Series

ARCA Menards Series
(key) (Bold – Pole position awarded by qualifying time. Italics – Pole position earned by points standings or practice time. * – Most laps led.)

References

1966 births
Living people
NASCAR drivers
ARCA Menards Series drivers
Racing drivers from Illinois
People from Centralia, Illinois